Eddington is the lava-flooded remnant of a lunar impact crater, located on the western part of Oceanus Procellarum. The western rim is attached to the wall of the walled plain Struve. To the east-southeast is the smaller but prominent crater Seleucus. South of Eddington is Krafft.

The south and southeastern rim of Eddington is almost completely gone, leaving only a few ridges and promontories in the lunar mare to trace the outline of the original crater. As a consequence, Eddington is now essentially a bay in the Oceanus Procellarum. The remainder of the rim is worn and irregular, forming a mountainous arc that is widest in the north. The floor is almost free of craters of significance, with the nearly submerged crater Eddington P lying in the southeast sector. If the crater once had a central peak, it is no longer evident.

The crater was named after the British astronomer and mathematician Sir Arthur Eddington.

Satellite craters
By convention these features are identified on lunar maps by placing the letter on the side of the crater midpoint that is closest to Eddington.

References

 
 
 
 
 
 
 
 
 
 
 
 

Impact craters on the Moon